Wife Swap may refer to:
Wife swapping (an act)
Wife Swap (British TV series), a British reality television program
Wife Swap (American TV series), an American reality television program
Wife Swap Australia, an Australian reality television program